The Dracoisen Formation is a geologic formation
 found on the islands of Spitsbergen and Nordaustlandet in Svalbard, Norway. It is Ediacaran (uppermost Neoproterozoic) in age. Microfossils have been found, including Bavinella faveolata and rare acritarchs.

See also

 List of fossiliferous stratigraphic units in Norway

References
 

Geology of Norway
Paleontology in Norway